The Monitor (original title: Babycall; titled The Monitor under US release) is a 2011 Norwegian thriller film written and directed by Pål Sletaune and starring Noomi Rapace. The original title, Babycall, is the Norwegian/Swedish term for a baby monitor; the film maintained this title upon release in Europe and Australia. The film was released on October 7, 2011 in Norway, and was released direct-to-video in the United States on July 24, 2012.

Plot

Anna (Noomi Rapace) and her 8-year-old son Anders (Vetle Qvenild Werring) move into a large flat outside Oslo. Anna is concerned that they will be found by her violent husband after being relocated. The two receive occasional visits from two child care workers, Grete and Ole, who warn Anna that her ex-husband may soon reopen a custody case over Anders. Anders begins attending a nearby school.

Anna first forces Anders to sleep with her in her room, but when this is discouraged by the case workers she looks for a babycall (baby monitor) at an electronics store and meets Helge (Kristoffer Joner), a shy gentleman whose mother is dying in a hospital. The two begin to visit regularly at and near Helge's workplace. Helge tells Anna that his mother is unwell and currently at a hospital, and Anna tells Helge about her son. The two developed a friendly albeit fragile relationship - while Anna is an over-protective mother, Helge was an over-protected son unwilling to acknowledge the negative feelings he has about how his mother treated him as a child. Compelled to feel charitable towards over-protective mothers, Helge is only too eager to ‘understand’ Anna’s refusal to let go of Anders. Similarly, Anna is only too eager to believe that an over-protected son might grow up to understand why his mother would not let him go.

The first night Anders slept in his own room, Anna hears disturbing sounds on the babycall, including screaming. Terrified, Anna runs to Anders' room but finds him  asleep. The next day, Anna returns to the electronics store and spoke to Helge, who said that her monitor could pick up other frequencies if they were close enough, meaning that the screams were emanating from someone else within 50 meters. On a map of their apartment complex, drawn by Anders, Anna begins to try to decipher the source of the other frequency.

Anders approaches Anna with a similar looking boy as she waits to pick him up from school. Anders tells Anna that he has made a new friend and is going to take him home with them. Anna is fairly suspicious of the boy who hardly speaks and does not return Anna's gestures to connect with him. After hearing some ruckus Anna finds Anders in the kitchen, upset because he believes Anna ruined his picture, which now has a dead body covered in blood at the base of the apartments drawn on it. Anna denies adding this to the paper and attributes it to Anders' friend.

The next day, while Anders is at school Anna visits the lake near her home. Shortly thereafter Anders asks if Anna will show him the lake, and so she leads him to it, only for the two to arrive at a parking lot despite taking the same route. 
A few days later Anna follows a woman she believes had something to do with the screaming on the baby monitor. While she's there, Anna sees a man drowning a little boy, who is in fact Anders' friend. After the man and his party leave, Anna jumps into the water to try and retrieve the boy. She stays underwater for too long and blacks out.

Anna wakes up in a hospital, with a nurse telling her she was found looking confused at a parking lot, though her clothes were wet. Anna leaves the hospital and goes to Anders' school to retrieve him but she is told by the principal to leave him because there is a suspcision of child abuse. Anna disregards the principal and brings Anders home.

When the two arrive home Anna discovers that their front door is open. She suspects an intruder has entered the flat and has Anders hide in his room. It is revealed that Ole is there. He tells her that his partner has quit that it is now only up to him if Anna is to keep Anders with the case soon to be reopened. Ole advances on an uncomfortable Anna and tells her he will be back that evening. Anna then goes to the workplace of Helge and invites him for dinner.

While the two eat, there is a knock at the door. Anna asks Helge to answer it for her and she hides. Helge, seeming confused, opens the front door but no one is there. When he turns around he sees Anders' friend, whom he mistakes for Anders, who shows Helge bruises on his body and then runs off to the room of Anders. Helge tries to follow him but is confronted by Anna who yells at him and he leaves. Anna opens the window and calls for Helge to return but he does not. She sees Ole and hurriedly leaves the flat to evade Ole.

The next day Ole is back at Anna's and tells her that her ex-husband is coming right now to retrieve Anders. Anna lets Ole in and shortly hears knocking on the door. Panicked that it is her ex-husband, Anna grabs a pair of scissors, which she stabbed Ole with, killing him just outside her door. Helge, who has just arrived, pounds on the door trying to get Anna to open it. Helge runs into the apartment, to see Anna sitting on the windowsill with Anders' arms wrapped around her. Just as he reaches Anna, she leans forward and falls off the windowsill. Helge rushes down the building, sees Anna on the ground, but no Anders. When Helge asks Anna where Anders is, she isn't able to answer. Later Helge is told that Anna's husband killed Anders years ago, and that her husband had killed himself as well.

Helge finds the drawing of the apartment complex with a grave marked on the forest adjacent to it. He goes into the forest and finds a body wrapped, buried in the earth. It is of the boy imagined to be the friend of Anders, murdered by his abusive parents. Later, Helge sits next to Anna's body and retells the story of a boy and his mother. The ending scene shows a happy Anders and Anna strolling in the forest towards the lake, then sitting down by the water.

Reception
Rotten Tomatoes gives the film an approval rating of 75% based on 24 reviews, and an average rating of 5.90/10. Several critics singled out Rapace's performance for praise while giving mixed reviews to the film.

Kim Newman of Empire called it "genuinely creepy" and summarised it as "another Scandinavian thriller that will nestle uncomfortably in your head". Philip French of The Observer judged "The film and Rapace command our attention, though at the end one feels Norway has used up the whole of this year's quota of red herrings."  Peter Bradshaw of The Guardian was less positive, writing "It's a great idea for a thriller - but then other plotlines get muddled in, and everything unravels into a cop-out." Henry Fitzherbert of the Daily Express wrote "It's a great idea but there are too many confusing sub-plots and no satisfactory resolution."

References

External links
 
 Hollywood Reporter review

2011 films
Norwegian thriller films
Films directed by Pål Sletaune
Films scored by Fernando Velázquez
2011 thriller films
Films set in apartment buildings